Tetanolita negalis is a litter moth of the family Erebidae first described by William Barnes and James Halliday McDunnough in 1912. It is found in the Huachuca Mountains of Arizona in the United States.

External links
Moths of south-eastern Arizona

Herminiinae
Moths described in 1912